Darkness at Noon is a novel by Arthur Koestler.

Darkness at Noon may also refer to:
 Darkness at Noon (A Hawk and a Hacksaw album), 2005
 Darkness at Noon (Richard H. Kirk album), 1999
 Mahiru no ankoku (Darkness in the Noon), a 1956 Japanese film

See also
 Dark at Noon, comedy film
 Polar night, the opposite phenomenon of the midnight sun, or polar day